The Halprin Open Space Sequence is a series of urban open spaces and pedestrian zones between Southwest Lincoln Street and Clay Street, in downtown Portland, Oregon, United States. Designed by Lawrence Halprin, the project was completed during 1966–1970, and was added to the National Register of Historic Places on March 6, 2013.  It includes Keller Fountain Park, Lovejoy Fountain Park, and Pettygrove Park, along with several other elements.

See also

 National Register of Historic Places listings in Southwest Portland, Oregon
 Pedestrian malls in the United States

References

External links

National Register of Historic Places in Portland, Oregon
Pedestrian malls in the United States
Southwest Portland, Oregon